Harrison Central School District is a public school district serving the town and village of Harrison, New York in Westchester County, New York. It operates one high school, Harrison High School, one middle school, Louis M. Klein Middle School and four elementary schools, Purchase, Parsons, Harrison Avenue School (HAS), and Prestons.

History
The school district was established in the late nineteenth century as Union free School District No. 6, in conjunction with the neighboring town of Rye, New York. It has since severed ties with Rye, and now serves only residents of the town of Harrison, including the village of Harrison and Purchase, New York.

Spirit
The mascot for teams of all sports and all ages is the Husky. The colors are maroon and white.

External links
 Website of the Harrison Central School District

School districts in New York (state)
Harrison, New York
Education in Westchester County, New York